The Winnipeg Ice  (officially stylized as ICE) are a Canadian major junior ice hockey team based in Winnipeg, Manitoba. The team began competing in the Western Hockey League (WHL) in the 2019–20 WHL season, and plays home games at the Wayne Fleming Arena (Max Bell Centre) while construction on a new arena near Oak Bluff, Manitoba is completed.

History

The Ice were founded in 1996 as the Edmonton Ice, an expansion team owned by Ed Chynoweth, the WHL's longtime president.  The team relocated to Cranbrook, British Columbia in 1998, becoming the Kootenay Ice.  The Kootenay Ice were three-time WHL champions (2000, 2002, 2011) and captured the Memorial Cup in 2002.  The team was purchased by 50 Below Sports + Entertainment Inc. in 2017.

In January 2019, Ice management indicated the team would be relocating to Winnipeg after the 2018–19 season and play out of the Wayne Fleming Arena on the University of Manitoba campus until a new arena was completed.  As part of the relocation, the Ice were moved to the WHL's East Division. 

The Winnipeg Ice played their first regular season game on September 20 in Brandon, defeating the Brandon Wheat Kings by a score of 3–2.

Season-by-season record
Note: GP = Games played, W = Wins, L = Losses, OTL = Overtime losses, SOL = Shootout losses, GF = Goals for, GA = Goals against

Current roster
Updated January 8, 2023.

 

 
 

 

 

 

 

   
 
 

 

 

 
 

|}

NHL alumni

Peyton Krebs

References

External links

Ice hockey clubs established in 2019
Ice hockey teams in Winnipeg
Western Hockey League teams